Srikrishna Haldankar (1927 – 17 November 2016), better known as Babanrao Haldankar, was an Indian classical singer, composer, and music teacher of Agra gharana of Hindustani classical music.

Life and career
Babanrao Haldankar was the son of painter Sawlaram Haldankar (1882–1968), and has won awards through his career. and was an Adjunct Professor of Indian Music at the University of Mumbai.

Education
He had studied under Jaipur Gharana's doyenne Mogubai Kurdikar in 1950s but had a preference for Agra Gharana. Accordingly he switched to Ustad Khadim Hussain of Agra gharana, who settled in Mumbai from Jaipur, in 1959, and studied under him for 20 years. Babanrao Haldankar himself was a much sought after guru, and he taught many of the prominent artists coming up towards the end of 20th Century, including Arun Kashalkar and Devaki Pandit.

Works

References

Bibliography

External links
 Pandit Babanrao Haldankar, website

Hindustani singers
2016 deaths
Academic staff of the University of Mumbai
Indian music educators
1927 births
Singers from Mumbai
Agra gharana
20th-century Indian male classical singers
21st-century Indian male classical singers